Cymindis arnostiana is a species of ground beetle in the subfamily Harpalinae. It was described by Kaba.

References

arnostiana